Coleophora drymophila is a moth of the family Coleophoridae. It is found in Georgia and Azerbaijan.

The larvae feed on Carpinus and Alnus species. They feed on the leaves of their host plant.

References

drymophila
Moths described in 1991
Moths of Asia